Blessed Sacrament School is a privately funded Roman Catholic school located in Burlington, North Carolina.

History
Blessed Sacrament School was founded in 1935 when Colonel James H. Holt Jr. used his own house to open a school that could accommodate 25 students. Then in 1951 the school was moved to a building at 400 West Davis Street. Less than 44 years later the school moved again to its current home at 515 Hillcrest Avenue. The building was previously occupied by Hillcrest Elementary School. The school is member of National Catholic Educational Association and is currently accredited by Southern Association of Colleges and Schools.

Awards and achievements
Blessed Sacrament School received the Blue Ribbon Award for the year of 2003.

References

External links
http://www.bssknights.org/

Buildings and structures in Burlington, North Carolina
Educational institutions established in 1935
Private middle schools in North Carolina
Private elementary schools in North Carolina
Catholic elementary schools in North Carolina
Schools in Alamance County, North Carolina
1935 establishments in North Carolina